Kızım (English translation: My Daughter, English title: My Little Girl), is a Turkish television series aired from September 9, 2018 to May 31, 2019 on Fridays (with the exception of the first episode) at 8 pm, and based on the Korean drama My Fair Lady

Plot
Öykü Tekin Göktürk is an eight-year-old girl that lives with her mother's (Asu Karahan) friend, Zeynep Kaya, or, her aunt, who upon discovering that the girl has the only case of a rare genetic disease called Niemann-Pick in Turkey, decides to abandon her. She leaves Öykü a note with the address of her father, Demir Göktürk, who is an irresponsible law offender that had just been arrested on the morning of the day that Zeynep abandoned her. At the court, the judge lets Demir go on the condition that he takes custody of Öykü as her father, which had been proved by a false paternity test conducted by Demir's best friend (brother), Uğur Adıgüzel, although that false test was unnecessary because Demir was Öykü's biological father. At first, Demir accepts the deal, but he does not want to care for Öykü. Then Demir finds out that Öykü has Niemann-Pick, so he decides to change to help her through the situation.

Cast
Buğra Gülsoy as Demir Göktürk
Beren Gökyıldız as Öykü Tekin Göktürk
Leyla Lydia Tuğutlu as Candan Hoşgör Göktürk
Serhat Teoman as Cemal Eröz
Selin Şekerci as Asu Karahan
Sinem Ünsal as Sevgi Günay Adıgüzel
Suna Selen as Müfide Adıgüzel
Tugay Mercan as Uğur Adıgüzel
Elif Verit as Zeynep Kaya
Gökhan Soylu as Dr. İhsan Erbil
Elit Andaç Çam as Ayla
Eliz Neşe Çağın as İlayda
Ece Akdeniz as Betul
Deniz Ali Cankorur as Mertcan
Günes Çaglar as Cenk Hoşgör
Faruk Barman as Murat
İhsan İlhan as Jilet
Mehdi Adlin as Ahmet

External links
 Official website

References

Turkish drama television series
2018 Turkish television series debuts
2019 Turkish television series endings
Television series by Med Yapım
Turkish television soap operas
Turkish-language television shows
Turkish television series based on South Korean television series